The M-100 was a two-stage Soviet sounding rocket. As some 6640 of these rockets were built between 1957 and 1990, it was the most used sounding rocket model ever. Payloads typically radioed science data to ground while descending by parachute.  Cross-calibrations with Western counterparts has allowed data's inclusion in global databases. Production ceased following the dissolution of the Soviet Union.

M-100 rockets were launched from sites in the former Soviet Union. Launches also took place from Kerguelen island, Koroni in Greece and Akita in Japan.

Data
 Payload: 15 kg
 Maximum flight height: 120 km
 Launch mass: 475 kg
 Diameter: 0.3 m
 Length: 8.34 m

References
 M-100 at Encyclopedia Astronomica

Sounding rockets of the Soviet Union